The Pleasant Valley Community School District (PVCSD) is a rural public school district headquartered in Riverdale, Iowa, near Bettendorf. The district spans areas of Scott County, including Riverdale, eastern Bettendorf, Pleasant Valley, LeClaire, and Panorama Park.

School board members are elected from seven director districts, five within Bettendorf's city limits and two others serving LeClaire-area residents. The board meets twice monthly at the district's administrative center.

The high school has one of the largest bands in the state of Iowa, with more than 300 members.

The school district is accredited by the North Central Association of Colleges and Schools and the Iowa Department of Education.

Facilities
Pleasant Valley High School and the administrative center are in Riverdale.
Pleasant Valley Junior High School, located on the outskirts of LeClaire
Bridgeview Elementary, LeClaire
Cody Elementary, LeClaire
Forest Grove Elementary, Bettendorf
Hopewell Elementary, Bettendorf
Pleasant View Elementary, Bettendorf
Riverdale Heights Elementary, Bettendorf

Enrollment

See also 
 Lists of school districts in the United States
 List of school districts in Iowa

References

External links
 Pleasant Valley School District - Official site
 
 

School districts in Iowa
Education in Scott County, Iowa